The 2008 Stroud Council election took place on 1 May 2008 to elect members of Stroud District Council in Gloucestershire, England. One third of the council was up for election and the Conservative Party stayed in overall control of the council.

After the election, the composition of the council was
Conservative 31
Labour 7
Green 6
Liberal Democrat 5
Independent 2

Background
Before the election the council had 31 Conservative, 9 Labour, 5 Green, 4 Liberal Democrat and 2 independents. 61 candidates stood for the 17 seats that were being contested, with the Green party contesting every seat for the first time. Councillors standing down at the election included Conservative Sue Fellows and the Labour Party's Hilary Fowles and Mattie Ross.

Election result
The results saw the Conservatives stay in control with 31 seats, after both gaining and losing 2 seats, while increasing their vote share to 51%. The Conservatives gained the seats of Dursley and Stonehouse from Labour, after the sitting Labour councillors had stood down, reducing Labour to 7 seats. However the Conservatives also lost Nailsworth by 28 votes to the Greens and Wotton-under-Edge by 25 votes to the Liberal Democrats. This meant the Greens went up to 6 seats and the Liberal Democrats up to 5 seats, while there remained 2 independents who had not defended seats in the election. Turnout in the election varied from a high of 50.03% in Painswick to a low of 33% in Cainscross.

The local Labour Member of Parliament David Drew blamed the defeats for Labour on "general disillusionment with the Government" and the issues of government assistance after the 2007 floods and the abolition of the 10 pence income tax rate.

Ward results

References

2008 English local elections
2008
2000s in Gloucestershire